Dame Elizabeth Anne Lucy Forgan, DBE (born 31 August 1944) is an English journalist, and radio and television executive.

Early life
Forgan was educated at Benenden School, Kent, and St Hugh's College, Oxford, then an all-female college.

She initially worked on newspapers starting with the Teheran Journal as Arts Editor 1967–68, at the Hampstead and Highgate Express (1969–74), and on London's Evening Standard (1974–78, and later as a columnist 1997–98).

She was editor of The Guardian's women's pages from 1978 to 1982, a Guardian columnist during 1997 and 1998, becoming a non-executive director of the Guardian Media Group from 1998.

Media management
Forgan was a founding commissioning editor and then Director of Programmes at the UK's Channel 4 from 1981 to 1990.

She joined the BBC in 1993 to become Managing Director, BBC Network Radio where she developed the format for BBC Radio Five Live and launched the DAB digital radio service.

She left the BBC in February 1996 over a  disagreement with John Birt, then BBC Director General, over the decision to move BBC Radio News from Broadcasting House to Television Centre.

Forgan was appointed the sixth chairman of The Scott Trust in 2003, the owner of the Guardian newspapers.

Public organisations
Between 2001 and 2008 Forgan was the Chair of the National Heritage Memorial Fund and Heritage Lottery Fund.

She is also board member of the Conservatoire for Dance and Drama, Trustee of the Royal Anniversary Trust, a former Board Member of the British Film Institute, a Trustee of the Media Trust and of the Phoenix Trust, and Chair of the Churches Conservation Trust.

In February 2009 Forgan became Chair of Arts Council England, the first woman to head the British arts funding organisation. Appointed in the last year of a Labour Government, she was viewed with suspicion by the Conservative-Liberal Democrat coalition. In the October 2010 Government spending review, the Arts Council suffered a 29.6% funding cut, and was also ordered to halve its administrative costs.

Honours
Liz Forgan was promoted Dame Commander of the Order of the British Empire for services to Radio Broadcasting in 2006 having previously been appointed OBE in 1998.

In 2014 she was elected an Honorary Fellow of the British Academy.

See also
 Jill Tweedie for details of the National Portrait Gallery Group portrait of Forgan, Tweedie, Polly Toynbee and Mary Stott (editors of Guardian's Women's Page) and Posy Simmonds.

References

External links
 Heritage Lottery Fund
 Interview at the British Entertainment History Project

1944 births
Alumni of St Hugh's College, Oxford
BBC executives
People educated at Benenden School
British television executives
Women television executives
Dames Commander of the Order of the British Empire
Fellows of Girton College, Cambridge
Living people
Trustees of the British Museum
The Guardian journalists
British women journalists
British columnists
Channel 4 people
British women columnists
Women's page journalists
Honorary Fellows of the British Academy